J. Krishna Palemar is a former member of the Karnataka Legislative Assembly from Mangalore City North(erstwhile Surathkal) and a member of the Bhartiya Janata Party, who had served as Minister of Environment and Ports in the B. S. Yeddyurappa government and as Minister for Ports, Science and Technology in the D. V. Sadananda Gowda Government. By profession, he is a realtor, builder, businessman and an educationist.

He resigned as a Minister on February 8, 2012 during the Video clip controversy, when he was caught on camera viewing a pornographic video clip on a mobile device.

The Legislature Committee has given him a clean chit in Video clip controversy.

Member of Legislative Assembly 
He was elected as Member of Legislative Assembly in the following years.
 2004
 2008

Positions held 
 Minister for Fisheries, Ports and Inland Water Transport; Small Savings and Lotteries
 Minister for Ports, Science and Technology
 District-in-charge Minister for Dakshina Kannada and Madikeri

References

Bharatiya Janata Party politicians from Karnataka
Living people
State cabinet ministers of Karnataka
Karnataka MLAs 2008–2013
Year of birth missing (living people)